The Idol of Pomos is a stone prehistoric sculpture found near the Cypriot village of Pomos. 
It dates back to the Chalcolithic period, circa the 30th century BC.

The sculpture is on display in the Cyprus Museum in Lefkosia (Nicosia).

Symbolism
The sculpture probably represents a woman with her arms spread. The gender is assumed from many similar sculptures found in Cyprus with small protrusions on their chests to indicate the female gender. These figurines were probably used as a fertility symbol. Smaller versions were worn as amulets around the neck, just as this idol wears (a small copy of) itself.

Euro
In 2008 Cyprus adopted the Euro. The Idol, a representation of Cypriot prehistoric art, was chosen to be displayed on the Cypriot euro coins of 1 and 2 euro.

References

Archaeological discoveries in Cyprus
Archaeological discoveries in Europe
Cypriot art
Prehistoric sculpture